With the enactment of the 23rd amendment to the Constitution in 1961, the district has been permitted to participate in presidential elections. It is part of the "blue wall", having voted for all Democratic nominees since 1964.

The majority of residents want the district to become a state and gain full voting representation in Congress, which was confirmed with a 2016 referendum. To prepare for this goal, the district has been electing shadow congresspeople since 1990. The shadow senators and shadow representative emulate the role of representing the district in Congress and pushe for statehood alongside the non-voting House delegate. All shadow congresspeople have been Democrats.

Party strength, 1875–present

Notes

References

See also
Voting rights debate in Washington, D.C.
Elections in the District of Columbia

Politics of Washington, D.C.
Government of the District of Columbia